Emmanual Tucker  has been Bishop of Bo since 2008.

References

Anglican bishops of Bo
Living people
21st-century Anglican bishops in Sierra Leone
Year of birth missing (living people)